Clifford Arthur Edgehill (born July 21, 1926, originally spelled Edghill) is an American hard bop jazz drummer active in the 1950s, 1960s and 1970s, appearing on several of the Prestige recordings recorded at the successive Van Gelder Studios, in Hackensack and Englewood Cliffs, including Mal Waldron's debut album, Mal-1 (1956), but especially with Eddie "Lockjaw" Davis and Shirley Scott.

Born in Brooklyn, New York, his first professional work was touring with Mercer Ellington in 1948, and in 1953 he toured with Ben Webster. He played with Kenny Dorham's Jazz Prophets in 1956 and with Gigi Gryce and in 1957-58 toured with Dinah Washington.

He was a member of Eddie "Lockjaw" Davis' quartet with George Duvivier and/or Wendell Marshall, and Shirley Scott, and appears on several of Scott's recordings, including her debut album, Great Scott! (1958), as well as on Very Saxy (1959), featuring Eddie "Lockjaw" Davis, Buddy Tate, Coleman Hawkins, and Arnett Cobb on tenors, an album recorded shortly after Blow Arnett, Blow (1959).

As well as appearing on recordings with the above line-ups, he also played in quartets led by Horace Silver, including one featuring Cecil Payne, in 1954, and at Minton's with Hank Mobley and Doug Watkins, a line-up that also jammed on one occasion with Charlie Parker and Annie Laurie.

Discography
With Mildred Anderson
Person to Person (Bluesville, 1960)

With David Amram
No More Walls (1971)

With Arnett Cobb
Blow Arnett, Blow (1959)

With Eddie "Lockjaw" Davis
Eddie Davis Trio Featuring Shirley Scott, Organ (Roulette, 1958)
 The Eddie Davis Trio Featuring Shirley Scott (Roost, 1958)
Smokin' (1958)
The Eddie "Lockjaw" Davis Cookbook (1958)
Jaws (1958)
The Eddie "Lockjaw" Davis Cookbook, Vol. 2 (1958)
The Eddie "Lockjaw" Davis Cookbook Volume 3 (1958)
Very Saxy (1959)Jaws in Orbit (1959)Bacalao (1959)Moodsville Volume 4 (1960)Misty (1963)

With Kenny Dorham'Round About Midnight at the Cafe Bohemia (1956)Kenny Dorham and the Jazz Prophets, Vol. 1 (1956)

With Little Jimmy ScottIf You Only Knew  (1955)

With Shirley Scott
 Great Scott! (1958)Scottie (1958) Shirley's Sounds (recorded 1958, released 1961)Shirley Scott Plays Horace Silver (1959)Scottie Plays the Duke (1959)Soul Searching (1959)Moodsville Volume 5 (1960)Like Cozy (1960)
 Soul Sister (1960)Now's the Time (recorded 1958–1964, released 1967)Workin'  (1967)Stompin' (1967)
With Al Smith
 Hear My Blues (Bluesville, 1959)
With Mal WaldronMal-1'' (1956)

References

1926 births
Living people
American jazz drummers
Hard bop drummers
Jazz musicians from New York (state)
Musicians from New York (state)
People from Brooklyn